Wolfgang Amadeus Mozart's String Quartet No. 15 in D minor, K. 421/417b is the second of the Quartets dedicated to Haydn and the only one of the set in a minor key. Though undated in the autograph, it is believed to have been completed in 1783, while his wife Constanze Mozart was in labour with her first child Raimund. Constanze stated that the rising string figures in the second movement corresponded to her cries from the other room.

Structure 
Average performances of the whole string quartet vary in length from 23 to 33 minutes. It is in four movements:
 Allegro moderato
 Andante (F major)
 Menuetto and Trio (the latter in D major). Allegretto
 Allegretto ma non troppo

The first movement is characterized by a sharp contrast between the aperiodicity of the first subject group, characterized by Arnold Schoenberg as "prose-like," and the "wholly periodic" second subject group. In the Andante and the Minuet, "normal expectations of phraseology are confounded." The main part of the Minuet is in minuet sonata form, while "the contrasting major-mode Trio ... is ... almost embarrassingly lightweight on its own ... [but] makes a wonderful foil to the darker character of the Minuet." The last movement is a set of variations. The movement ends in a picardy third.

Notes 

References

Sources

External links

Performance of String Quartet No. 15 by the Borromeo String Quartet from the Isabella Stewart Gardner Museum in MP3 format

15
Compositions in D minor
1783 compositions